West Midlands was a constituency of the European Parliament. It was represented by seven MEPs using the D'Hondt method of party-list proportional representation. In 2009, the constituency was reduced to six seats, but also elected a "virtual MEP" who took her seat in the Parliament when the Treaty of Lisbon came into effect. The constituency was represented by seven MEPs prior to the 2009 election, until the UK exit from the European Union on 31 January 2020.

Boundaries 

The constituency corresponded to the West Midlands region of England, comprising the ceremonial counties of Herefordshire, Shropshire, Staffordshire, Warwickshire, West Midlands and Worcestershire.

History 
It was formed as a result of the European Parliamentary Elections Act 1999, replacing a number of single-member constituencies. These were Birmingham East, Birmingham West, Coventry and North Warwickshire, Herefordshire and Shropshire, Midlands West, Worcestershire and South Warwickshire, and parts of Peak District, Staffordshire East and Derby, and Staffordshire West and Congleton.

Returned members

Election results 

Elected candidates are shown in bold. Brackets indicate the number of votes per seat won.

2019 

Anthea McIntyre became an MEP in November 2011 when the relevant provisions of the Treaty of Lisbon came into effect, her addition being based on the 2009 vote. Phil Bennion became an MEP on the resignation of Liz Lynne.

References

Bibliography
MEPs by region: West Midlands constituency

European Parliament constituencies in England (1999–2020)
Politics of the West Midlands (region)
1999 establishments in England
Constituencies established in 1999
Constituencies disestablished in 2020